Knottingley railway station serves the town of Knottingley in West Yorkshire, England.

The station is the final one in West Yorkshire before the North Yorkshire border and most services terminate (or start) there.

History
The station was constructed by the Wakefield, Pontefract & Goole Railway as part of their main line from Wakefield to Goole, which opened in April 1848.  It was not long though before it became a busy junction, as within two years links to Doncaster via the Askern branch (on 6 June 1848), Leeds via Castleford and Methley Junction (1 December 1849) and York via Ferrybridge and Burton Salmon (1 August 1850) had all been opened. The first of those was jointly built and operated by the Lancashire and Yorkshire Railway and Great Northern Railway and the station also became jointly managed by these two companies in 1854.  The Great Northern made use of its running powers and traffic agreements with the LYR to run through trains from Doncaster to both Leeds and York, putting the town on a new main line between London & York for a number of years until shorter, more direct lines could be constructed.

By 1871 the station had lost its trunk line status with the opening of new lines from Doncaster via Wakefield (to Leeds) & Selby (to York), but it still handled plenty of local passenger and freight traffic (particularly coal from a large number of collieries in the area).

Whilst all of the aforementioned lines are still open, only the original WP&G routes now carry passenger trains as services to York ended on 11 July 1947 and those to Doncaster just over a year later on 27 September 1948.  The line to Wakefield Kirkgate also lost its passenger trains from 2 January 1967 (leaving only the route to Leeds serving the station) but it was re-opened in May 1992 with financial assistance from West Yorkshire PTE.  Services on the Leeds line were re-routed via the former NER station at  Central from 7 October 1968.

Regular passenger trains on the Askern line now operate once again (commencing on 23 May 2010 after an absence of more than 60 years), following the decision to grant open access operator Grand Central track access rights for a new service between London King's Cross and Bradford Interchange in January 2009.  These run via the Askern line, Pontefract, Wakefield and Brighouse to reach Bradford but are not able to call at Knottingley as the old Doncaster line platforms have long been removed.

It opened in 1967 to maintain the locomotives and hopper wagons for planned 75 Merry-go-round trains a day, expected to use the Wakefield and Goole line. As much of the coal traffic has now ceased, the depot 
closed in 2020, but the depot lines are still used by occasional railway traffic.

Facilities
Like most of the stations on the route, Knottingley station has lost its main buildings and now only has standard waiting shelters on each of its two remaining platforms.  Digital display screens, timetable posters and customer help points are located on both sides to offer train running information.  Both platforms are signalled for use in either direction, so it is advisable to check the display screens prior to travel to determine which one is being used for a particular train.  Step-free access is only available to platform 2 from the car park - the footbridge to platform 1 has stairs and is the only means of access to it.

Services
There is now a half-hourly service from Knottingley to  since the spring 2018 timetable change. One train to and two trains from Goole run Mondays to Saturdays.

On Sundays there is an hourly service to/from Leeds (alternating via Castleford and Wakefield), but no trains east of here.

New Northern franchise operator Arriva Rail North extended the Wakefield service through to Westgate and on to  via  as part of the new franchise agreement that was implemented in April 2016.  The Sunday service has also been doubled to hourly from May 2018, with trains running alternately via Castleford and Wakefield.

Notes

References
Body, G. (1988), PSL Field Guides - Railways of the Eastern Region Volume 2, Patrick Stephens Ltd, Wellingborough,

External links

Railway stations in Wakefield
DfT Category F1 stations
Former Great Northern Railway stations
Former Lancashire and Yorkshire Railway stations
Railway stations in Great Britain opened in 1848
Northern franchise railway stations
Knottingley